Anglet Hormadi Pays Basque is an ice hockey team in Anglet, France. They play in the Ligue Magnus, the highest level of ice hockey in France.

The club was runner-up (Ligue Magnus) in 2001.

Due to Anglet's location in the French Basque Country, they also participated in the Superliga Espanola de Hockey Hielo, the top level Spanish league in 2007–08 and 2008–09.

History
Anglet Hormadi Élite was founded in 1969 and first took part in the Ligue Magnus, the top level French league, in the 1996–97 season. During the 1994–95 NHL Lockout, Brian Propp joined Hormadi. In the 2000–01 season, the club lost in the final of the Ligue Magnus. Two years later Anglet made it to the final of the Coupe de France, but were defeated.

After Anglet Hormadi Élite was relegated from the Ligue Magnus after the 2006–07 season, they dropped all the way to FFHG Division 3, the lowest level of French ice hockey, due to lack of funds. In the 2007–08 season, they also joined the Superliga Espanola de Hockey Hielo, the highest level of Spanish ice hockey. In their first season in Spain, they finished as runner-up in the championship, and lost in the semifinal of the Copa del Rey.

They won the FFHG Division 3 in 2009 and the FFHG Division 2 in 2010, and participated in the FFHG Division 1 from 2010 to 2018. In 2018 Homadi Anglet gained promotion to the Ligue Magnus for the first time in 12 years, after they defeated Albatros de Brest in the FFHG Division 1 playoff finals.

Award in the Ligue Magnus
 Jean-Pierre Graff Trophy : 2002 (Xavier Daramy)

Captains
Jacques Dorotte
Tony Rojo
Didier Barace
Jacques Bareyre
Jean-Michel Benac
Jean-Yves Decock
Lionel Bilbao
2001–2002 Robert Ouellet
2002–2004 Jean-Christophe Filippin
2004–2018 Xavier Daramy
2018-Thomas Decock

Roster 
Updated February 1, 2019.

Achievements

France
Ligue Magnus runner-up: 2001
FFHG Division 1 champion: 1997, 2017
FFHG Division 2 champion: 2010
FFHG Division 3 champion: 2009
Coupe de France runner-up: 2003

Spain
Spanish runner-up: 2008.

Notable players
Robert Ouellet
Éric Raymond
Denis Perez
Olivier Dimet
Roberto Baldris
Marko Lapinkoski
Stanislas Solaux
Lionel Bilbao
David Dostal
Michał Garbocz
Vesa Lahtinen
Brian Propp
Slavomir Vorobel
Serge Poudrier
Eddy Ferhi
Sebastian Ylönen
Dominique Ducharme

Notable coaches
Karlos Gordovil
Olivier Dimet
Heikki Leime

References

External links
Official website 
Ligue Magnus site 

Ice hockey teams in France
Ice hockey clubs established in 1969
1969 establishments in France
Sport in Pyrénées-Atlantiques